Hypotrix is a genus of moths of the family Noctuidae.

Species
 Hypotrix alamosa (Barnes, 1904)
 Hypotrix aselenograpta Dyar, 1916
 Hypotrix basistriga Lafontaine, Ferris & Walsh, 2010
 Hypotrix carneigera Guenée, 1852
 Hypotrix cirphidia (Draudt, 1924)
 Hypotrix clarcana Dyar, 1916
 Hypotrix diapera (Hampson, 1913)
 Hypotrix diplogramma (Schaus, 1903)
 Hypotrix duplicilinea (Dognin, 1908)
 Hypotrix euryte (Druce, 1898)
 Hypotrix ferricola (Smith, 1903)
 Hypotrix flavigera Guenée, 1852
 Hypotrix hueco (Barnes, 1904)
 Hypotrix lunata Smith, 1906
 Hypotrix naglei Lafontaine, Ferris & Walsh, 2010
 Hypotrix niveilinea (Schaus, 1894)
 Hypotrix ocularis Lafontaine, Ferris & Walsh, 2010
 Hypotrix optima (Dyar, [1920])
 Hypotrix parallela Grote, 1883
 Hypotrix proxima (Draudt, 1924)
 Hypotrix purpurigera Guenée, 1852
 Hypotrix quindiensis (Draudt, 1924)
 Hypotrix rubra Lafontaine, Ferris & Walsh, 2010
 Hypotrix sedecens (Schaus, 1903)
 Hypotrix spinosa (Barnes & McDunnough, 1912)
 Hypotrix trifascia (Smith, 1891)
 Hypotrix umbrifer (Dyar, 1916)
 Hypotrix vigasia (Schaus, 1894)

References
Natural History Museum Lepidoptera genus database

 
Hadeninae